Neoeuantha is a genus of parasitic flies in the family Tachinidae.

Species
Neoeuantha aucta (Wiedemann, 1830)
Neoeuantha sabroskyi Guimarães, 1982

References

Diptera of South America
Dexiinae
Tachinidae genera
Taxa named by Charles Henry Tyler Townsend